Boschi is a surname. Notable people with the surname include:

Alfonso Boschi (1615–1649), Italian painter of the Baroque period, active mainly in Florence
Fabrizio Boschi (1572–1642), Italian painter of the early-Baroque period, active in Florence
Francesca Vanini-Boschi (died 1744), Italian contralto singer of the 18th century
Francesco Boschi (1619–1675), Italian painter of the Baroque period, active mainly in Florence
Giovanni Carlo Boschi (1715–1788), Italian clergyman who was made a cardinal by Pope Clement XIII
Giulia Boschi (born 1962), Italian film and television actress
Giulio Boschi (1838–1920), Italian Cardinal of the Roman Catholic Church who served as Archbishop of Ferrara
Giuseppe Maria Boschi (1698–1744), Italian bass singer
Hélène Boschi (1917–1990), Franco-Swiss pianist, born in Lausanne
Maria Elena Boschi (born 1981), Italian lawyer and politician

See also
Ancilla boschi, a species of sea snail, a marine gastropod mollusk
Gymnothorax boschi, a marine fish of the family Muraenidae
Leptomyrina boschi, a butterfly in the family Lycaenidae
Nebria boschi, a metal coloured species of ground beetle
Ranularia boschi, a species of predatory sea snail
Boschi Sant'Anna, a commune with 1,346 inhabitants in the province of Verona
Boshi (disambiguation)